The Thomas Fenner House or the "Sam Joy Place" is a historic stone-ender house in Cranston, Rhode Island. It the oldest surviving house in the Providence Plantations portion of Rhode Island. The only older structure in the state is the White Horse Tavern in Newport.  The house was built as a farmhouse in 1677 after King Philip's War by Captain Arthur Fenner for his son Major Thomas Fenner. The house was added to the National Register of Historic Places in 1990. The House is available for short stays by those interested in the historical and architectural significance of the property.  It also is made available to educational groups to visit and study. 

Captain Arthur Fenner's original homestead, which was known as "Fenner Castle" (circa 1652) was burnt to the ground in King Philip's War. Captain Arthur was appointed Captain of the militia and his son Thomas was appointed Major.  They were among a small handful of men "one who staid and went not away" in the defense of Providence.    After the war, in 1677, Arthur rebuilt his home also built, for his son, the Major Thomas Fenner house.  The "Fenner Castle" stood until 1896 when the chimney was demolished. Arthur's great grandson, Thomas's grandson) was Governor Arthur Fenner who donated a piece of wood from Captain Arthur's "Fenner Castle" for what is now the RI Mace.  He did so to honor his grandfather, Captain Arthur Fenner who so bravely defended Providence from the Indians.

See also
National Register of Historic Places listings in Providence County, Rhode Island

References

External links
Cranston Historical Society information about the house
An audio slideshow about the Fenner house

Houses in Cranston, Rhode Island
Houses on the National Register of Historic Places in Rhode Island
Houses completed in 1677
Historic American Buildings Survey in Rhode Island
National Register of Historic Places in Providence County, Rhode Island
1677 establishments in Rhode Island